Girma Ashenafi (Amharic: ግርማ አሸናፊ; born 28 July 1982) is a former Ethiopian footballer. He was born in Dire Dawa.

Ashenafi played for Ethiopia at the 2001 FIFA World Youth Championship in Argentina.

References

External links

1982 births
Living people
Sportspeople from Dire Dawa
Ethiopian footballers
Ethiopia international footballers
Association football midfielders
Dire Dawa City S.C. players